Church Square may refer to:

 Church Square, Pretoria
 Church Square (Cape Town)
Church Square (Columbus, Georgia), listed on the National Register of Historic Places in Georgia